The Queen of Pellagonia (Swedish: Drottningen av Pellagonien) is a 1927 Swedish silent comedy film directed by Sigurd Wallén and starring Vera Schmiterlöw, Stina Berg and Gustaf Lövås. It was shot at the Råsunda Studios in Stockholm. The film's sets were designed by the art director Vilhelm Bryde.

Cast
 Vera Schmiterlöw as 	Käthie Löwenborg
 Stina Berg as Josefina Pettersson
 Felix Grönfeldt as 	Gösta Salén
 Gustaf Lövås as Jönsson
 Lennart Wallén as 	Kalle
 Ossian Brofeldt as Sund 
 Knut Lambert as 	Gentleman 
 John Melin as 	Rund 
 Kurt Welin as 	Grund

References

Bibliography
 Gustafsson, Tommy. Masculinity in the Golden Age of Swedish Cinema: A Cultural Analysis of 1920s Films. McFarland, 2014.
 Qvist, Per Olov & von Bagh, Peter. Guide to the Cinema of Sweden and Finland. Greenwood Publishing Group, 2000.

External links

1927 films
1927 comedy films
Swedish comedy films
Swedish silent feature films
Swedish black-and-white films
Films directed by Sigurd Wallén
1920s Swedish-language films
Silent comedy films
1920s Swedish films